A national plebiscite was held in Chile on 25 October 2020. The referendum asked the citizens whether they wanted a new constitution to be drafted, and if so, whether it should be written by a constitutional convention made up of directly elected citizens or by a mixed convention that was composed of currently serving members of Parliament and half of directly elected citizens. The "Approve" side won by a landslide, with 78% of voters agreeing to draft a new constitution. When it came to deciding how the new text should be written, 79% of voters opted for a "Constitutional Convention." The voter turnout was 51%.

A second vote was held between 15 and 16 May 2021, in conjunction with the municipal and gubernatorial elections. This vote elected the members of the Constitutional Convention. The new draft constitution was then rejected in a third vote held on 4 September 2022.

The plebiscite was a response to the 2019 Chilean protests, particularly the so-called "biggest march of Chile" took place in Santiago on 25 October 2019 and was participated in by over 1.2 million people.

Postponement
Due to the COVID-19 pandemic, on 24 March 2020, the Congress agreed to reschedule the plebiscite originally set for 26 April 2020 to 25 October 2020, and the subsequent Convention election from 25 October 2020 to 11 April 2021 (and later, to 15–16 May 2021). The change, which required a constitutional reform, was promulgated by the President and published in the country's Official Gazette on 26 March 2020.

Campaign

Parties supporting Approve

Parties supporting Reject

Opinion polls 
National polls for the first question: Do you want a new constitution?

National polls for the second question: What kind of body should write the new constitution?

Results

First ballot: "Do you want a New Constitution?"

a Includes 59,522 electors voting from abroad.
Source: Tricel.

Second ballot: "What kind of body should write the New Constitution?"

a Includes 59,522 electors voting from abroad.
Source: Tricel.

References

External links
Presidential decree calling for the 26 April 2020 referendum, published in Chile's Official Gazette on 27 December 2019 (in Spanish).
Constitutional reform changing the date of the plebiscite, published in Chile's Official Gazette on 26 March 2020 (in Spanish).

Referendums in Chile
Chile
2020 in Chile
April 2020 events in Chile
October 2020 events in Chile
2019–2020 Chilean protests
Chile
Presidency of Sebastián Piñera